Chez Ashton is a popular fast food restaurant in Quebec, Canada famous for its poutine.  Chez Ashton's origins can be traced to a traveling snack cart started by Ashton Leblond in 1969.  It was not until 1972, however, that poutine was first offered.  Ashton hooked his customers by initially giving free samples of his poutine.  The enterprise grew in popularity until Leblond was able to open a restaurant with a dining room open year-round in 1976.  Today, the franchise has grown to include 25 restaurants in the Quebec City region.

Chez Ashton is also famous for its winter promotion scheme during the month of January. The price of poutine drops with the temperature.

References

External links

Chez Ashton

Fast-food chains of Canada
Restaurants in Quebec
Companies based in Quebec City